Crithote is a genus of moths of the family Noctuidae. The genus was erected by Francis Walker in 1864.

Species
 Crithote horripides Walker, 1864
 Crithote pannicula (Swinhoe, 1904)
 Crithote prominens Leech, 1900

References

Calpinae
Moth genera